Sanlu Highway is a station on the Pujiang line of the Shanghai Metro. It began passenger trial operation with the rest of the Pujiang line on March 31, 2018.

References 

Railway stations in Shanghai
Shanghai Metro stations in Minhang District
Railway stations in China opened in 2018
Pujiang line